The first USS Sabine was a sailing frigate built by the United States Navy in 1855. The ship was among the first ships to see action in the American Civil War. In 1862, a large portion of the  crew were volunteers from the Sabine.

She was built at the New York Navy Yard. Her keel was laid in 1822, but she was not launched until 3 February 1855. During this period, she underwent various alterations, the most extensive being a lengthening of her hull by twenty feet. Built essentially from  plans, she was commissioned on 23 August 1858, Capt. Henry A. Adams in command.

Service history

Paraguay Expedition and Home Fleet, 1858–1861

She conveyed Commissioner Bowlin and served as flagship during the voyage to South America, but was not officially considered part of the expedition fleet, as she was not designed to act against Paraguay, not being able to ascend the river. The expedition won the United States an indemnity, an apology, and a renewed treaty. Sabine then operated out of New York with the Home Fleet until July 1861.

Civil War, 1861–1865

Through July and August, she was out of commission at Portsmouth Naval Shipyard. Recommissioning on 30 August, she was ordered to join the Atlantic Blockading Squadron on 9 September.

During the Civil War, Sabine was actively employed along the east coast searching for Confederate raiders.

Sabine returned to New York for blockade duty with the North Atlantic Blockading Squadron until ordered in August 1864 to Norfolk, Virginia as a training ship for Navy apprentices and landsmen.

Training ship, 1865–1877
After the war, she was transferred to New London, Connecticut for the same purpose until 1868. In 1867, an apprentice on Sabine, Frank Du Moulin, was awarded the Medal of Honor for rescuing a crewmate who had fallen from the rigging into the water. In 1869 and 1870, the ship conducted midshipman training cruises to European and Mediterranean ports. In 1871 Sabine was repaired at Boston; and, from 1872 to 1876, she served as a receiving ship at Portsmouth, New Hampshire. In 1877, she was laid up until she was sold on 23 September 1883 at Portsmouth to J.L. Snow of Rockland, Maine.

Memorials 
The last remaining armament from the Sabine, a 6.4 inch 100 Pounder Parrot Rifled Naval Cannon, currently resides on display outside the Grand Traverse County courthouse in Traverse City, Michigan. It was one of the two 100-pounder rifled cannons that were mounted on swiveling carriages on the Sabine. The cannon was donated to Grand Traverse County by Senator William Alden Smith in 1910.

See also

Union Navy
Union blockade

References

External links 
 

Sailing frigates of the United States Navy
Ships built in Brooklyn
Ships of the Union Navy
American Civil War patrol vessels of the United States
1855 ships